Clarence Gordon may refer to:

Clarence C. Gordon (1928–1981), American botanist
Clarrie Gordon (1917–1983), New Zealand Olympic boxer